"She's Too Good to Be True" is a song written by J.P. Pennington and Sonny LeMaire, and recorded by American country music group Exile.  It was released in April 1987 as the fifth single from the album Hang On to Your Heart.  The song was Exile's ninth number one country song.  The single went to number one for one week and spent a total of fourteen weeks on the country chart.

Charts

Weekly charts

Year-end charts

References
 

1987 singles
Exile (American band) songs
Songs written by J.P. Pennington
Song recordings produced by Buddy Killen
Epic Records singles
1986 songs
Songs written by Sonny LeMaire